Eremias is a genus of lizards in the family Lacertidae, the wall lizards. They are native to Asia and southeastern Europe, where they live in desert and steppe regions.

Species

The following 42 species are recognized.

Eremias acutirostris (Boulenger, 1887) – point-snouted racerunner
Eremias afghanistanica Böhme & Szczerbak, 1991 – Afghan racerunner
Eremias andersoni Darevsky & Szczerbak, 1978 – Anderson's racerunner
Eremias argus W. Peters, 1869 – Mongolia racerunner
Eremias arguta (Pallas, 1773) – steppe-runner
Eremias aria S.C. Anderson & Leviton, 1967
Eremias brenchleyi Günther, 1872 – Ordos racerunner
Eremias buechneri Bedriaga, 1906 – Kaschar racerunner
Eremias cholistanica Baig & Masroor, 2006
Eremias dzungarica Orlova, Poyarkov Jr., Chirikova, Nazarov, Munkhbaatar, Munkhbayar, & Terbish, 2017 – Dzungarian racerunner
Eremias fahimii Mozaffari, Ahmadzadeh & Saberi-Pirooz, 2020- Fahimi's racerunner 
Eremias fasciata Blanford, 1874 – Sistan racerunner
Eremias grammica (Lichtenstein, 1823) – reticulate racerunner
Eremias intermedia (Strauch, 1876) 
Eremias isfahanica Rastegar-Pouyani, Hosseinian, Rafiee, Kami, Rajabizadeh, & Wink, 2016 –
Eremias kavirensis Mozaffari & Parham, 2007
Eremias kakari Masroor, Khisroon, Khan, and Jablonski, 2020 – Kakar's racerunner
Eremias killasaifullahi Masroor, Khan, Nadeem, Amir, Khisroon, & Jablonski, 2022 – Killa Saifullah’s racerunner
Eremias kokshaaliensis Jeremčenko & Panfilov, 1999
Eremias kopetdaghica  Szczerbak, 1972 – Kopet Dagh racerunner
Eremias lalezharica Moravec, 1994 – Lalezhar racerunner
Eremias lineolata (Nikolsky, 1897) – striped racerunner
Eremias montana N. Rastegar-Pouyani & E. Rastegar-Pouyani, 2006 – mountain racerunner
Eremias multiocellata Günther, 1872 – multi-ocellated racerunner
Eremias nigrocellata Nikolsky, 1896 – black-ocellated racerunner
Eremias nikolskii Bedriaga, 1905 – Kirghiz racerunner
Eremias papenfussi Mozaffari, Ahmadzadeh & Parham, 2011
Eremias persica Blanford, 1875
Eremias pleskei Nikolsky, 1905 – Pleske's racerunner
Eremias przewalskii (Strauch, 1876) – Gobi racerunner
Eremias quadrifrons (Strauch, 1876) – Alachan racerunner
Eremias rafiqi Masroor, Khan, Nadeem, Amir, Khisroon, & Jablonski, 2022 – Rafiq’s racerunner
Eremias regeli Bedriaga in Nikolsky, 1905
Eremias roborowskii (Bedriaga, 1912)
Eremias scripta (Strauch, 1867) – sand racerunner
Eremias strauchi Kessler, 1878 – Strauch's racerunner
Eremias stummeri Wettstein, 1940 – Stummer's racerunner
Eremias suphani Başoğlu & Hellmich, 1980 – Başoğlu's racerunner, Suphan racerunner
Eremias szczerbaki Jeremčenko, Panfilov & Zarinenko, 1992 – Szczerbak's racerunner
Eremias velox (Pallas, 1771) – rapid racerunner, rapid fringe-toed lizard
Eremias vermiculata Blanford, 1875 – variegated racerunner, Central Asian racerunner
Eremias yarkandensis Blanford, 1875 – Yarkand racerunner, Yarkand sandlizard

References

Further reading
Wiegmann AFA (1834). Herpetologia Mexicana, seu descriptio amphibiorum Novae Hispaniae, quae itineribus comitis de Sack, Ferdinandi Deppe et Chr. Guil. Schiede in Museum Zoologicum Berolinense pervenerunt. Pars prima, saurorum species amplectens. Adiecto systematis saurorum prodromo, additisque multis in hunc amphibiorum ordinem observationibus. Berlin: C.G. Luderitz. vi + 54 pp. + Plates I-X. (Eremias, new genus, p. 9). (in Latin). 

 
Lizard genera
Taxa named by Leopold Fitzinger